Günther Steinhausen (15 September 1917 – 6 September 1942) was a World War II  Luftwaffe Flying ace with 40 combat victories to his name. He was also a posthumous recipient of the Knight's Cross of the Iron Cross.

Biography
Günther Steinhausen was born 15 September 1917 at Lobkevitz, on the island of Rügen. After flight training, Steinhausen was posted, as an Unteroffizier, to 1./JG 27 (the 1st squadron of the 27th Fighter Wing) in the spring of 1941, transferring with the unit to North Africa soon after.

The first Luftwaffe fighter unit in Africa, they were initially based at Ain-el-Gazala, just west of the besieged port of Tobruk. Flying the older Bf 109E-7, it was still found to be eminently competitive against the British squadrons based there. He recorded his first victory on 9 June, shooting down a Hawker Hurricane north of Tobruk. On 26 August 1941, Steinhausen claimed his fifth victory: probably a Tomahawk IIb AK374 of No. 250 Squadron flown by British ace Sgt. Maurice Hards (7 victories) who force-landed wounded near Mersa Matruh.

In August, as the remaining Gruppen of Jagdgeschwader 27 transferred in to North Africa from Russia as reinforcements, I./JG 27 rotated its squadrons back to Germany to re-equip onto the Bf 109F.

After the British Operation Crusader in November and December had relieved Tobruk and driven the Axis back, in January Rommel had sufficient fuel supplies to launch his next counter-attack, and he took Benghazi on 29 January, as the aircrew retraced their steps to airfields they had abandoned only a month or so previously. On 28 March Steinhausen claimed his 10th victory, when he shot down a Kittyhawk fighter of No. 94 Squadron RAF flown by P/O Crosbie, near Timimi.

Four days after his 13th victory on 22 May 1942, Rommel launched his offensive that would eventually take the Axis forces right across Libya and into Egypt, almost to the gates of Alexandria. It was this time, as with many other pilots of JG 27 that was to be particularly successful for Steinhausen. With a rush of multiple victories he advanced his tally: a pair of South African Tomahawks on 31 May, followed by four fighters in the El Adem area on 16 June (20-23v.) and then a further four Hurricanes (of No. 238 Sqn (RAF)) on 28 June over Sidi Haneish (27-30v.).

On 9 July, Steinhausen shot down a United States Army Air Forces (USAAF) B-24 Liberator, ("Eager Beaver"), and only the second four-engine bomber claimed by JG 27. One of six bombers of the Halverston Detachment that had been sent to attack an Axis supply convoy, it was his 34th victory. By now the front had stabilised at the Alamein line and both sides paused to draw breath, and build up supplies for their next offensives. In the interim, he was awarded the Ehrenpokal (Honour Goblet) on 5 August, and then the German Cross in Gold on 21 August, for his success to date.

At the end of August, activity picked up again, and Rommel launched his assault on the fortified Alamein line at the beginning of September. On 6 September 1942, on an early-morning patrol, Fw Steinhausen shot down a Hurricane of No. 7 Sqn (SAAF) or No. 274 Sqn (RAF) near El Alamein for his 40th victory. However, he was then himself shot down in his Bf 109F-4 "White 5" (Werknummer 13272—factory number) southeast of El Alamein. His body was never recovered. One analyst asserts that James Francis Edwards was his victor since his combat report tallies with the action, though he only claimed a "damaged" Bf 109. Another objects, since the time differences do not match. Christopher Shores and his co-authors noted Steinhausen was killed in the morning at 08:00 local time. Francis made a claim between 17:30 and 18:50 in an evening sortie. They assert the more certain candidates are Sergeant W J Malone and Flight Lieutenant R L Mannix from No. 127 Squadron RAF. Both made claim at approximately 08:25 to 09:35.

Günther Steinhausen was credited with 40 victories, all recorded over the Western Desert, all but two of those were over single-seat fighters. On 3 November he was posthumously awarded the Knight's Cross of the Iron Cross and promoted to Leutnant.

Summary of career

Aerial victory claims
Steinhausen was credited with 40 aerial victories.

Awards
 Iron Cross (1939) 2nd and 1st class
 Honour Goblet of the Luftwaffe (Ehrenpokal der Luftwaffe) on 10 August 1942 as Feldwebel and pilot
 German Cross in Gold on 21 August 1942 as Feldwebel in the I./Jagdgeschwader 27
 Knight's Cross of the Iron Cross on 3 November 1942 as Feldwebel and pilot in the 1./Jagdgeschwader 27

Notes

References

Citations

Bibliography

 
 
 
 
 
 
 
 
 
 
 
 
 

1917 births
1942 deaths
Luftwaffe pilots
German World War II flying aces
Recipients of the Knight's Cross of the Iron Cross
Luftwaffe personnel killed in World War II
Aviators killed by being shot down
Missing in action of World War II
Aerial disappearances of military personnel in action
Military personnel from Mecklenburg-Western Pomerania
People from Vorpommern-Rügen